Eteläsuomalainen osakunta (ESO) is one of the 15 student nations at the University of Helsinki, Finnish-speaking, established in 1905 and it has Uusimaa and Eastern Uusimaa as recruitment regions. Before 1905, Nylands Nation (NN) gathered both Finnish- and Swedish-speaking university students from Southern Finland, but seceded from NN in 1905 to form a similar, but Finnish-speaking nation.

Premises
ESO has its premises in downtown Helsinki, at Uusi Ylioppilastalo, at Mannerheimintie 5, alongside four other Nations, Savolainen osakunta, Varsinaissuomalainen osakunta, Åbo Nation and Östra Finlands Nation.

Friendship nations
The Nation has friendship contracts with several student nations, student associations and student societies at universities in Finland, Estonia, Sweden, Denmark, Norway and Germany.

Finland
 Nylands Nation (University of Helsinki)
 Sähköinsinöörikilta (Aalto University)

Estonia

Sweden
 Malmö nation (University of Lund)
 Stockholms nation (University of Uppsala)
 Värmlands nation (University of Uppsala)

Denmark
 Studenterforeningen (University of Copenhagen)

Norway
 Det Norske Studentersamfund (University of Oslo)

Germany
 Der Allgemeine Studierenden Ausschuss der Johannes Gutenberg Universität Mainz (University of Mainz)

References

External links